Amata kuhlweinii, the cool handmaiden, is a moth of the family Erebidae. It was described by Alexandre Louis Lefèbvre de Cérisy in 1832 (or 1831). It is found in South Africa and Tanzania.

References

kuhlweini
Moths described in 1832
Moths of Africa